PASM may refer to:

 Parrot assembly language
 Pima Air & Space Museum, in Tucson, Arizona, United States
 Program, aperture priority, shutter priority, and manual modes on the mode dial in many cameras
 St. Mary's Airport (Alaska), ICAO location indicator: PASM
 Porsche Active Suspension Management, an electronic damping control system